Ningwaphuma or Ningwaphumang (niŋwaphumaŋ) is the almighty god in Kirat mythology, who first created the universe and Earth, per this story:

In the beginning, the earth was without form and void, and darkness was upon the face of the deep. In the middle of such darkness, a forceful power existed. He was the omnipresent God Almighty about whom nothing can be said.

Almighty God caused the creation of the small burning fire, of the great light, of water, and of wind.

Kiranti